Karl Alexander Deisseroth (born November 18, 1971) is an American scientist. He is the D.H. Chen Professor of Bioengineering and of psychiatry and behavioral sciences at Stanford University.

He is known for creating and developing the technologies of hydrogel-tissue chemistry (e.g., CLARITY, STARmap) and optogenetics, and for applying integrated optical and genetic strategies to study normal neural circuit function, as well as dysfunction in neurological and psychiatric disease.

In 2019, Deisseroth was elected as a member of the US National Academy of Engineering for molecular and optical tools for his discovery and control of neuronal signals behind animal behavior in health and disease. He is also a member of the US National Academy of Sciences and the US National Academy of Medicine.

Education
Deisseroth earned his AB in biochemical sciences from Harvard University, and his MD and PhD in neuroscience from Stanford University in 1998. He completed his medical internship and psychiatry residency at Stanford University School of Medicine.

Career
Deisseroth has led his laboratory at Stanford University since 2004. He serves as an attending physician at Stanford Hospital and Clinics and has been affiliated with the Howard Hughes Medical Institute (HHMI) since 2009. Between 2014 and 2019, he was a foreign Adjunct Professor at Sweden's Karolinska Medical Institute.

In 2021, he authored a book titled Projections: A Story of Human Emotions, published by Random House, where he explores the origins of human emotions through personal encounters with patients.

Research
Light-gated ion channels, optogenetics, and neural circuits of behavior

In 2005, Deisseroth's laboratory, including graduate students Edward Boyden and Feng Zhang, published the first demonstration of the use of microbial opsin genes encoding light-gated ion channels (channelrhodopsins) to achieve optogenetic control of neurons, allowing reliable control of action potentials with light at millisecond precision. Deisseroth named this field "optogenetics" in 2006 and followed up with optogenetic technology development work leading to many applications, including psychiatry and neurology. In 2010, the journal Nature Methods named optogenetics "Method of the Year".

For developing optogenetics, Deisseroth received in 2010 the Nakasone Award; in 2013 the Lounsbery Award and the Dickson Prize in Science; in 2014 the Keio Medical Science Prize; and in 2015 the Albany Prize, Lurie Prize, Dickson Prize in Medicine, and Breakthrough Prize in Life Sciences. He also received the 2015 BBVA Foundation Frontiers of Knowledge Award in Biomedicine, jointly with Edward Boyden and Gero Miesenböck. In 2016, Deisseroth received the Massry Prize along with Peter Hegemann and Miesenböck for "optogenetics, a technology that utilizes light to control cells in living tissues". In 2016, the Harvey Prize from the Technion in Israel was awarded to Deisseroth and Hegemann "for their discovery of opsin molecules, involved in sensing light in microorganisms, and their pioneering work in using these opsins to develop optogenetics". Deisseroth was then awarded Japan's highest private prize, the Kyoto Prize, in 2018, for "his discovery of optogenetics and the development of causal systems neuroscience", becoming the youngest recipient of the award to date. In 2019, Deisseroth, Hegemann, Boyden, and Miesenböck won the Warren Alpert Foundation Prize. Finally in 2020, Deisseroth received the Heineken Prize from the Royal Netherlands Academy of Arts and Sciences, "for developing optogenetics — a method to influence the activity of nerve cells with light".

Deisseroth is also known for achieving insight into the light-gated ion channel pore of channelrhodopsin itself, through his teams' initial high-resolution crystal structures of cation and anion-conducting channelrhodopsins and through a body of structure/function work discovering mechanisms of channelrhodopsin kinetics, ion selectivity, and color selectivity, together with his frequent collaborator Peter Hegemann. Two major prizes paid particular attention to Deisseroth's work on elucidation of the structure and function of light-gated ion channels—the 2016 Harvey Prize to Deisseroth and Hegemann for the "discovery of opsin molecules, involved in sensing light in microorganisms, and for the pioneering work in utilizing these opsins to develop optogenetics", and the 2018 Gairdner Award, which noted "his group discovered the fundamental principles of the unique channelrhodopsin proteins in molecular detail by a wide range of genomic, biophysical, electrophysiological and structural techniques with many mutants in close collaboration with Peter Hegemann").

Deisseroth's lab also achieved single-cell optogenetic control in living animals through a combination of optogenetics and high-resolution light guidance methods, including in behaving mice.

Although the first peer-reviewed paper demonstrating activation of neurons with a channelrhodopsin was from his lab in mid-2005, Deisseroth has emphasized that many "pioneering laboratories around the world" were also working on the idea and published their papers within the following year; he cites Stefan Herlitze and Alexander Gottschalk/Georg Nagel, who published their papers in late 2005, and Hiromu Yawo and Zhuo-Hua Pan, who published their initial papers in 2006 (Pan's early observation of optical activation of retinal neurons expressing channelrhodopsin would have occurred in August 2004, according to Pan, about a month after Deisseroth's initial observation). Deisseroth has published the notebook pages from early July 2004 of his initial experiment showing light activation of neurons expressing a channelrhodopsin. Deisseroth also pointed out that an even earlier experiment had occurred and was published by Heberle and Büldt in 1994, in which functional heterologous expression of a bacteriorhodopsin for light-activated ion flow had been published in a non-neural system (yeast). Optogenetics with microbial opsins as a general technology for neuroscience was enabled only by the full development of versatile strategies for targeting opsins and light to specific cells in behaving animals.

The majority (~300 papers)
of Deisseroth's publications have been focused on the application of his methods to elucidate how mammalian survival-related behaviors like thirst and anxiety, whether adaptive or maladaptive, arise from the activity of specific cells and connections in neural circuitry. Several awards have specifically noted Deisseroth's neuroscience discoveries in this way, separate from his contributions to channelrhodopsin structure or optogenetics.

Other awards:
 Deisseroth's 2018 Kyoto Prize cited his "causal systems neuroscience".
 The 2013 Pasarow Prize was awarded to Deisseroth for "neuropsychiatry research".
 The 2013 Premio Citta di Firenze was given to Deisseroth for "innovative technologies to probe the structure and dynamics of circuits related to schizophrenia, autism, narcolepsy, Parkinson's disease, depression, anxiety and addiction".
 The Redelsheimer Award from the Society for Biological Psychiatry was awarded to Deisseroth for "furthering the field's understanding of the neuroscience underlying behavior".
 Deisseroth's 2017 Fresenius Prize cited "his discoveries in optogenetics and hydrogel-tissue chemistry, as well as his research into the neural circuit basis of depression".

Chemical assembly of functional materials in tissue

Deisseroth is known also for a separate class of technological innovation. His group has developed methods for chemical assembly of functional materials within biological tissue. This approach has a range of applications, including probing the molecular composition and wiring of cells within intact brains.

The first step in this direction was hydrogel-tissue chemistry (HTC), in which "specific classes of native biomolecules in tissue are immobilized or covalently anchored (for example, through individualized interface molecules to gel monomer molecules)". Then, "precisely timed polymerization causing tissue-gel hybrid formation is triggered within all the cells across the tissue in an ordered and controlled process to ultimately create an optically and chemically accessible biomolecular matrix". In 2013, Deisseroth was senior author of a paper describing the initial form of this method, called CLARITY (with a team including first author postdoctoral fellow in his lab Kwanghun Chung, and neuroscientist Viviana Gradinaru). This method makes biological tissues, such as mammalian brains, translucent and accessible to molecular probes.
CLARITY
has been widely used,
and many variants on the basic HTC backbone have been developed in other labs as well since 2013 (reviewed in).

A key feature of HTC is that the hydrogel-tissue hybrid "becomes the substrate for future chemical and optical interrogation that can be probed and manipulated in new ways". For example, HTC variants now enable improved anchoring and amplification of RNA, reversible size changes (contraction or expansion), and in situ sequencing (reviewed in). In particular, STARmap is an HTC variant that allows three-dimensional cellular-resolution transcriptomic readouts within intact tissue.)

Several major prizes have cited Deisseroth's development of HTC, including:
 The 2017 Fresenius Prize "for his discoveries in optogenetics and hydrogel-tissue chemistry, as well as his research into the neural circuit basis of depression".
 The 2015 Lurie Prize in Biomedical Sciences  "for leading the development of optogenetics, a technology for controlling cells with light to determine function, as well as for CLARITY, a method for transforming intact organs into transparent polymer gels to allow visualization of biological structures with high resolution and detail".
 The 2013 Premio Citta di Firenze
 The Redelsheimer Award for "optogenetics, CLARITY, and other novel and powerful neural circuit approaches in furthering the field's understanding of the neuroscience underlying behavior".
 The 2015 Dickson Prize in Medicine
 The 2020 Heineken Prize for Medicine, for "developing optogenetics — a method to influence the activity of nerve cells with light — as well as for developing hydrogel-tissue chemistry, which enables researchers to make biological tissue accessible to light and molecular probes."

In 2020, Deisseroth and Zhenan Bao described another chemical synthesis of functional material in situ, this time with cell-specific chemistry. Their genetically targeted chemical assembly (GTCA) method instructs specific living cells to guide chemical synthesis of functional materials. The initial GTCA created electrically functional (conductive or insulating) polymers at the plasma membrane, and the team noted "Distinct strategies for the targeting and triggering of chemical synthesis could extend beyond the oxidative radical initiation shown here, while building on the core principle of assembling within cells (as reaction compartments) genetically and anatomically targeted reactants (such as monomers), catalysts (such as enzymes or surfaces), or reaction conditions (through modulators of pH, light, heat, redox potential, electrochemical potential, and other chemical or energetic signals)."

Honors and awards

 2005 Presidential Early Career Award for Scientists and Engineers
 2010 Nakasone Award, Human Frontier Science Program
 2010 Koetser Award for Brain Research
 2011 W. Alden Spencer Award
 2012 Zuelch Prize, with Peter Hegemann, Georg Nagel, and Ernst Bamberg
 2012 Perl-UNC Prize
 2013 Premio Città di Firenze
 2013 Goldman-Rakic award, Brain & Behavior Research Foundation
 2013 Jacob Heskel Gabbay Award
 2013 Brain Prize, Lundbeckfonden
 2013 Robert J. and Claire Pasarow Foundation Medical Research Award
 2013 Richard Lounsbery Award
 2013 Dickson Prize in Science
 2014 Keio Medical Science Prize
 2015 Albany Medical Center Prize
 2015 Lurie Prize in Biomedical Sciences
 2015 Breakthrough Prize in Life Sciences
 2015 Dickson Prize in Medicine
 2015 BBVA Foundation Frontiers of Knowledge Award
 2016 Massry Prize, with Peter Hegemann and Gero Miesenböck
 2017 Redelsheimer Award, Society for Biological Psychiatry
 2017 Fresenius Prize, Else Kröner-Fresenius Foundation
 2017 Harvey Prize, with Peter Hegemann
 2018 Leibinger Prize
 2018 Eisenberg Prize, University of Michigan
 2018 Canada Gairdner International Award
 2018 Kyoto Prize (Advanced Technology)
 2019 Warren Alpert Foundation Prize, with Ed Boyden, Peter Hegemann, and Gero Miesenböck
 2019 National Academy of Engineering Membership
 2020 Heineken Prize for Medicine
 2021 Albert Lasker Award for Basic Medical Research
 2022 Louisa Gross Horwitz Prize
 2023 Japan Prize, with Gero Miesenböck

Personal life
Deisseroth is married to neuroscientist Michelle Monje, with whom he has four children.

References

External links

 Academic home page, with links to resource pages
 Howard Hughes Medical Institute bio
 Stanford OTL Inventor Portfolio – Karl Deisseroth

Living people
1971 births
American psychiatrists
American neuroscientists
Howard Hughes Medical Investigators
Stanford University School of Medicine faculty
Members of the United States National Academy of Sciences
Members of the National Academy of Medicine
Harvard University alumni
Stanford University School of Medicine alumni
Recipients of the Albert Lasker Award for Basic Medical Research
Richard-Lounsbery Award laureates
Physician-scientists
Kyoto laureates in Advanced Technology